Adana is a city and council of the municipality of San Millán in the province of  Álava, Basque Country, Spain.

Location
The town of Adana is located 2 km south of the town of Acilu and 2 km east of Gauna (both villages belonging to the municipality of Iruraiz-Gauna). The east borders the towns of Guereñu (3 km) and Chinchetru (3.7 km). It is located on the banks of the Santa Isabel stream, at 618 m elevation. To the south of the town there is an area planted with oak and beech.

Population
This population is bordered by the Acilu populations (of Iruraiz-Gauna). According to the INE in 2010 Adana had a population of 52 inhabitants.

Populated places in Álava